Bold Emmett Ireland's Martyr is an American silent film produced by Sid Films and distributed by Lubin Manufacturing Company. It was directed by Sidney Olcott and played by Valentine Grant, Sidney Olcott and PH O'Malley in the leading roles. Shot in 1914 it was released in 1915.

Cast
 Valentine Grant - Nora Doyle
 Sidney Olcott - Con Daly
 Laurene Santley - Mrs Doyle
 Jack Melville - Robert Emmett
 PH O'Malley - Major Kirk
 Robert Rivers : Feely, the informer

Production notes
The film was shot in Beaufort, co Kerry, in Ireland during summer 1914.

References
 Michel Derrien, Aux origines du cinéma irlandais: Sidney Olcott, le premier oeil, TIR 2013.  
 Denis Condon, Touristic Work and Pleasure: The Kalem Company in Killarney

External links
 Bold Emmett Ireland's Martyr at Irish Film & TV Research Online
  Bold Emmett Ireland's Martyr website dedicated to Sidney Olcott
Full restored film at YouTube

1915 films
Silent American drama films
American silent short films
American black-and-white films
Films set in Ireland
Films shot in Ireland
Films directed by Sidney Olcott
1915 short films
1915 drama films
1910s American films